The Guthrie Corning Hospital is a rural hospital in Corning, New York. It opened June 4, 1900 at the Stearns House at East First and Chemung Streets. This was after a January 25 meeting at which the woman of the city considered organizing a hospital association. It initially opened with 9 beds, but today has 65 private patient rooms at the new facility opened in July, 2014, ten years after being acquired by Guthrie. In the transition, the hospital built the Guthrie Corning Cancer Center, a physical rehabilitation building, Guthrie HealthWorks Wellness & Fitness Center, and a same day surgicenter in Big Flats, New York. Its Wound Care Center won the 2018 Center of Distinction award from Healogics.

References 

Hospitals established in 1900
1900 establishments in New York (state)
Corning, New York
Hospitals in New York (state)